Dulce Amargo (Bittersweet) is a Venezuelan telenovela produced and aired on Televen in co-production with Mexican channel Cadena Tres and distributed internationally by Telemundo. It is a remake of the Chilean telenovela Los treinta, which is adapted by Venezuelan writer Iris Dubs. Official production of Dulce Amargo began on June 11, 2012, and premiered on October 31, 2012 in the prime-time hours.

Scarlet Ortiz and Erik Hayser star as the main protagonists with Fernando Noriega and Juliet Lima as the main antagonists. The co-protagonists include Roxana Díaz, Juan Carlos Martín del Campo, Alejandra Ambrosi, Carlos Guillermo Haydon, Alejandra Sandoval, Juan Carlos García, and Anabell Rivero.

It is the second telenovela produced in high definition by Televen after Nacer Contigo, and the first to be co-produced with Cadena Tres. The cast is composed of Venezuelan, Mexican, and Colombian actors.

Plot 
Dulce Amargo focuses on five couples and their daily struggles. The main couple are Mariana and Nicholas, who are about to celebrate their seven-year anniversary. Mariana, overwhelmed by the concern that she can develop a hereditary mental illness, decides to leave her husband and son to make them avoid the pain of seeing her suffering. But soon after, she will be unwittingly captivated by a new passion, and behind this romance will hide the madness of a psychopath. Nicholas and Mariana's friends try to help, but they must first resolve their own conflicts, including infidelity, jealousy, ambition, and addiction.

Dulce Amargo is a contemporary love story, full of suspense and excitement, in which the fall in love, as in real life, can be bitter sweet.

Cast

Starring 
 Scarlet Ortiz as Mariana Wilhelm
 Erik Hayser as Nicolás Fernández 
 Fernando Noriega as Diego Piquer
 Alejandra Ambrosi as Camila Ramos
 Juan Carlos García as Rubén Ascanio
 Roxana Díaz as Bárbara Aguilera
 Juan Carlos Martín del Campo as Juan Ángel Custodio
 Alejandra Sandoval as Sofía Hidalgo
 Anabell Rivero as Cristina Malavé
 Carlos Guillermo Haydon as Héctor Linares Alcantará

Also starring  
 Oriana Colmenares as Andrea Hidalgo
 Carlos Felipe Álvarez as Jesús Andrés Aguilera
 Juliet Lima as María Gabriela Hernández / La Maga
 Cristóbal Lander as Julio César Bueno
 Beatriz Vásquez as Claudia de la Rosa
 Flor Elena González as Adoración Díaz
 Daniel Alvarado as Benito Montilla

Recurring 
 Aileen Celeste as María Fernanda "Mafer" Aguero
 Gavo Figueira as Raymond Calzadilla
 Mariam Valero as Hortensia
 José Mantilla as Licenciado Albarrán
 Georgina Palacios as Laura Bello
 Elvis Chaveinte as El Loco Pereira
 Alejandro Díaz as Fernando
 Mariano Medina as Daniel Fernandez Wilhelm
 Arianna Lattierri as Lucía Linares Ramos
 María Verónica Ciccarino as Isabella Custodio Aguilera

Awards and nominations

Versions 
 – telenovela made in 2005 by TVN, written by Marcelo Leonart, Nona Fernández, Hugo Morales and Ximena Carrera; and starring Francisco Melo, Alejandra Fosalba, Katyna Huberman, Malucha Pinto, Álvaro Espinoza, Luz Valdivieso, Andrés Velasco, and Juan José Gurruchaga
Jura – telenovela made in 2006 by SIC, starring Ricardo Pereira and Patrícia Tavares

References 

Televen telenovelas
2012 telenovelas
Venezuelan telenovelas
2013 Venezuelan television series endings
2012 Venezuelan television series debuts
Mexican telenovelas
2013 Mexican television series debuts
2013 Mexican television series endings
Mexican television series based on Chilean television series
Spanish-language telenovelas